World Food Championships is a television series produced by A&E Television Networks and airing on the Fyi network. The show features competitors at the annual World Food Championships in Las Vegas where top chefs and home cooks compete for a top prize of $300,000.

Cast
 Tiffany Derry - Herself - Host (5 episodes)
 Ray Lampe - Himself - Guest Judge (5 episodes)
 Whitney Miller - Guest Judge (5 episodes)
 Jeffrey Saad - Himself - Host (5 episodes)
 Ben Vaughn - Guest Judge (5 episodes)
 Jodi Taffel - Herself (1 episode)

Season 1

Episode 1: Burger
Competitors compete in regional qualifiers around the world before the best of the best head to Las Vegas. Chefs create a signature burger in the first round. In round two they must create a patty melt with an original twist. In the third round the top 10 contestants compete using a secret ingredient.

Episode 2: Bacon
Chefs participate in three rounds, first creating a signature bacon dish, then reinventing a classic and finally making use of a mystery ingredient.

Episode 3: Sandwich
The chefs create three sandwiches: a signature sandwich, a reinvented classic and sandwich with a mystery ingredient.

Episode 4: Pasta
Contestants produce three noodle dishes: a signature pasta, a classic reinvented and pasta making use of a mystery ingredient.

Episode 5: BBQ
Top BBQ chefs compete in a two-part competition.

Episode 6: Finale
Top competitors from the burger, bacon, sandwich, pasta and BBQ categories compete in a head-to-head competition for the title of World Food Champion.

References

Cooking competitions in the United States
2010s American cooking television series
2010s American reality television series
2014 American television series debuts
Food reality television series